Without a Trace is an American television show about an FBI missing person unit in New York City.

Without a Trace may also refer to:
Without a Trace, a Hardy Boys Casefiles novel
Without a Trace, a Nancy Drew: Girl Detective novel
Without a Trace: Inside the Robert Durst Case, a 2002 book by Marion Collins about New York real-estate scion Robert Durst
Without a Trace (1983 film), a drama film starring Kate Nelligan and Judd Hirsch
Without a Trace (2000 film), a 2000 Spanish-language film starring Tiaré Scanda and Aitana Sánchez-Gijón
Spoorloos (Without a Trace), a 1988 Dutch-French film, also known by its English title The Vanishing
"Without a Trace", a song by Fates Warning from the 1985 album The Spectre Within
"Without a Trace", a song by Soul Asylum from the 1992 album Grave Dancers Union
"Without a Trace", a song by Trust Company from the 2005 album True Parallels